A tewhatewha is a long-handled Māori club weapon shaped like an axe. Designed to be held in two hands, the weapon comes to a mata (point) at one end and a rapa (broad, quarter-round head) at the other.

Use
Like pouwhenua and taiaha, this long club was designed for sparring and lightning strokes and thrusts, aided by quick footwork on the part of the wielder. The blows were not struck with the blade as one would with an axe, but rather with the thicker straight front edge. It was common for tewhatewha to be decorated with a bunch of split pigeon or hawk feathers which hang from a drilled hole near the lower edge of the extension. This decoration may have also had the added benefit of confusing an opponent

Modern use
A tewhatewha was the symbol of command of Royal New Zealand Navy hydrographic survey ship HMNZS Resolution.

The drum major of the New Zealand Army Band uses a tewhatewha instead of a mace to give direction and keep time.

See also
 Mau rākau

Other Māori weapons
Mere (weapon)
Kotiate  
Taiaha
Patu
Pouwhenua

References

External links
Tewhatewha in the collection of the Museum of New Zealand Te Papa Tongarewa

Ceremonial weapons
Clubs (weapon)
Māori weapons
New Zealand martial arts
Polearms